The Ireland women's national under-18 basketball team is a national basketball team of the Island of Ireland, administered by Basketball Ireland.
It represents the country in international under-18 women's basketball competitions. The team appeared at the FIBA U18 Women's European Championship Division B several times. They won the 1997 European Promotion Cup for Junior Women.

References

External links
Archived records of Ireland team participations

under18
Women's national under-18 basketball teams